The Institute of Muslim Minority Affairs is a London-based scholarly institution whose stated purpose is to advance the study of Muslims in non-Muslim nations. It holds conferences and publishes books and journals. Pakistani-born Dr. Saleha Mahmood Abedin, the mother of Hillary Clinton aide Huma Abedin, is Director of the Institute. It was founded in 1978 by Dr. Syed Zainul Abedin, Dr. Saleha Mahmood Abedin's husband, who is from India, and who was educated at Aligarh Muslim University and University of Pennsylvania. Abdullah Omar Naseef, then president of the Muslim World League and president of King Abdulaziz University, provided backing to Abedin for the institute's formation.

Journal of Muslim Minority Affairs

In 1979, the Institute of Muslim Minority Affairs launched the Journal of Muslim Minority Affairs, a peer-reviewed journal published by Taylor & Francis. It was formerly known as the Institute of Muslim Minority Affairs Journal. It is the only scholarly journal dedicated to research on Muslims as minorities within non-Muslim societies.

CNN reported that those familiar with the journal described it as "scholarly, academic and nonpartisan" and that its content "does not raise red flags."

References

External links
 Institute of Muslim Minority Affairs
 Journal of Muslim Minority Affairs

Islamic organisations based in the United Kingdom